Abaturikha is a rural locality (a village) in Vozhegodskoye Rural Settlement of Vozhegodsky District, Vologda Oblast, Russia. The population was 1 as of 2002.

Geography 
Abaturikha is located 10 km southwest of Vozhega (the district's administrative centre) by road. Popovka is the nearest rural locality.

References 

Rural localities in Vozhegodsky District